The St. Louis Cardinals are a Major League Baseball team based in St. Louis, Missouri. They are a member of the Central Division of Major League Baseball's National League. The team has played under three names since beginning play in 1882: the current moniker, the Perfectos, as well as the Browns. Since the franchise's inception,  players have made an appearance in a competitive game for the team, weather as an offensive player (batting and baserunning) or a defensive player (fielding, pitching, or both).

Of those , 53 have had the surnames beginning with the letter A. Two of those players have been inducted into the Baseball Hall of Fame: pitcher Grover Cleveland Alexander, who played for the Cardinals from 1926 to 1929 and first basemen Walter Alston who played for the team in 1926, but what inducted as a manager in 1983. However, Alexander's primary team was the Philadelphia Phillies, and Alston's primary team was the Los Angeles Dodgers.

Among the 32 batters in this list, leftfielder Harry Atkinson has the highest batting average: a .400 mark, with two hits in five plate appearances. Other players with an average over .300 include Benny Ayala (.333 in one season) and Matty Alou (.314 in three seasons). Dick Allen's 34 home runs lead Cardinals players whose name begins with A, as do Luis Alicea's 173 runs batted in. Of the list's 22 pitchers, Ted Abernathy has the best win–loss record, in terms of winning percentage; his one win and zero losses notched his a 1.000 win ratio in his one season for the team. Joaquín Andújar has the most wins (68), losses (53), and strikeouts (540). Alexander has the lowest earned run average (3.08) among qualifying pitchers.

Footnotes
 Key
  The National Baseball Hall of Fame and Museum determines which cap a player wears on their plaque, signifying "the team with which he made his most indelible mark". The Hall of Fame considers the player's wishes in making their decision, but the Hall makes the final decision as "it is important that the logo be emblematic of the historical accomplishments of that player’s career".
  Players are listed at a position if they appeared in 30% of their games or more during their Cardinals career, as defined by Baseball-Reference.com. Additional positions may be shown on the Baseball-Reference website by following each player's citation.
  Franchise batting and pitching leaders are drawn from Baseball-Reference.com. A total of 1,500 plate appearances are needed to qualify for batting records, and 500 innings pitched or 50 decisions are required to qualify for pitching records.
  Statistics are correct as of the end of the 2011 Major League Baseball season.

References 

 General
 
 

 Specific

St. Louis Cardinals all-time roster